Jan Stefan Persson (born 3 February 1967 in Malmö, Skåne) is a former freestyle swimmer from Sweden. His best result is a fourth place on 1500m Freestyle at the European LC Championships 1987 in Strasbourg.

Persson also holds the Swedish record in 800m and 1500m Freestyle in short course as well as the 1500m Freestyle in long course. Persson participated in the 1988 Summer Olympics in Seoul finishing 17th on the 1500m Freestyle. He was affiliated with the University of California, Berkeley in the United States.

Clubs
Malmö KK

References
sports-reference

1967 births
Living people
Swimmers at the 1988 Summer Olympics
Olympic swimmers of Sweden
University of California, Berkeley alumni
Malmö KK swimmers
Swedish male freestyle swimmers
Sportspeople from Malmö